Robert Wyse Jackson  (12 July 1908 – 21 October 1976) was an Irish Bishop and author.

Educated at Trinity College, Dublin, he qualified as a  barrister but was then ordained in 1934. He began his career as Curate of St James' Church, Broughton, Salford  after which he was Curate-in-charge of Corbally and then Rector of St Michael’s, Limerick from 1940 to 1943. He was Dean of the Cathedral Church of St John the Baptist and St Patrick’s Rock, Cashel from 1946 to 1960 and then Bishop of Limerick, Ardfert and Aghadoe from  1961  until his retirement in 1970.

Wyse Jackson was born in Kilcullen, County Kildare, Ireland, the son of Richard William Jackson and Belinda Hester Sherlock. He married twice; first to Margaretta Nolan McDonald, and second to Lois Margery Phair. He had seven children including Peter Wyse Jackson.

References

  

1908 births
1976 deaths
Christian clergy from Dublin (city)
Alumni of Trinity College Dublin
Deans of Cashel
Bishops of Limerick, Ardfert and Aghadoe
20th-century Anglican bishops in Ireland